Matthiew Klinck (September 5, 1978 – January 2, 2016) was a film director and producer who lived in Belize. He founded and operated the cinema arts training and production program Make-Belize Films. On January 4, 2016, Klinck was found dead outside his home in Selena, a village in Cayo District, Belize.

Directed
2012: Kurse a di Xtabai (2012)
Tagayet (2012)
Hank and Mike (2008)
Greg & Gentillon (2005)
Straight (2002)
Une mission à partager (2001)
Lord Kurt (2001)
Chunkydonkey (2001) (TV series)
Hank and Mike (2000)
Y B Normal? (1998) (TV series)

References

External links

1978 births
2016 deaths
Film directors from Quebec
People from Gatineau